Katrine Anne Hildyard (born 1 April 1970) is an Australian politician representing the electoral district of Reynell in the Parliament of South Australia as a member of the South Australian Labor Party since the 2014 state election.

Hildyard has served as the Minister for Child Protection, the Minister for Women and the Prevention of Domestic and Family Violence, and the Minister for Recreation, Sport and Racing in the Malinauskas ministry since March 2022. She was previously appointed to the Weatherill ministry in September 2017 as Minister for Disabilities and served in this role until the 2018 state election.

Background and early career 
Hildyard was born in Adelaide and grew up in Netley with her brother and two sisters. During Hildyard's childhood her mother was the victim of domestic violence from her estranged father, which shaped her passion on the issue in later life. Hildyard attended Plympton High School and studied a Bachelor of Arts at Flinders University as a mature age student. She worked as a cleaner, shop assistant, lecturer, and clerical worker. She later graduated from the Australian Institute of Company Directors and was a Fellow of the Governor's Leadership Foundation.

Hildyard joined the Labor Party in the 1990s and became a member of the Labor Left. She worked for ALP Senator Nick Bolkus between 1994 and 1996.

In 1996 Hildyard began working for the South Australian branch of the Australian Services Union (ASU), where she was elected Assistant Secretary in 2006 and later Secretary in 2009. As Secretary the ASU campaigned for overwhelmingly female community sector workers to have their wages increased to match their mainly-male private sector counterparts. An equal pay case before Fair Work Australia was successful in 2012, and the State Government committed to increasing wages between 19 and 41 per cent. The ASU also committed to supporting same-sex marriage and lobbying the Labor Party to change its policy, which at the time was opposed to any change.

In 2008 Hildyard participated in the social inclusion stream of the Australia 2020 Summit. She was appointed to the Premier's Council for Women in 2011.

Political career 
At the 2014 state election Hildyard was elected as the Labor member for Reynell, replacing retiring member Gay Thompson. In her maiden speech, Hildyard said her priorities included reducing domestic violence, supporting equal pay for women, maintaining high quality mental health services, and recognising Indigenous Australians in the constitution.

Hildyard lobbied Attorney-General John Rau to include paid domestic violence leave as an industrial right for 120,000 public sector employees.

In February 2015 Hildyard was promoted to the position of Parliamentary Secretary to the Premier.  She also led a taskforce on Women in Sport, composed of athletes, administrators and event managers, to help close the pay gap for women athletes and encourage investment in women's sport. She joined fellow MPs Nat Cook and Chris Picton, located in Adelaide's southern suburbs, to oppose the government's proposed changes to emergency department services at the Noarlunga Hospital. Hildyard pledged to update the Equal Opportunity Act to prevent discrimination against victims of domestic violence, and to provide paid annual leave to victims so they can attend medical and police appointments, and move house if necessary. She also launched a parliamentary anti-domestic violence group with Liberal MP Dan Van Holst Pellekaan.

Hildyard was elected the President of the South Australian Labor Party in October 2015. Hildyard also co-sponsored a bill to remove discrimination against same-sex parents being listed on the birth certificate of a child. Hildyard was appointed to cabinet in September 2017 as Minister for Disabilities; and served in this role until Labor lost the 2018 state election.

She was re-elected in the 2022 South Australian state election on an increased majority. Labor also won government in the election. She was appointed as Minister for Child Protection, Minister for Women and the Prevention of Domestic and Family Violence and Minister for Recreation, Sport and Racing in the Malinauskas ministry.

Recognition
Hildyard was honoured in the 2011 South Australian Women's Honour Roll for her work in fighting for pay equity for women.

Personal life 
Hildyard lives in Christies Beach with her husband, Charles, and two children. She is a practising Catholic.

She is a long-time supporter of the Southern Football League, and provides live commentary of games from that competition in a weekly radio broadcast during the football season.

References

External links
Parliamentary Profile: SA Labor website
 

Living people
Australian Labor Party members of the Parliament of South Australia
Australian Roman Catholics
People from Netley
Politicians from Adelaide
Women members of the South Australian House of Assembly
21st-century Australian politicians
1970 births
21st-century Australian women politicians